Stiromella is a genus of true bugs belonging to the family Delphacidae.

The species of this genus are found, for example, in Estonia.

Species:
 Stiromella albeola Mitjaev, 1967 
 Stiromella allata Dubovskiy, 1970

References

Delphacidae